Eric Walter John Ball OBE (31 October 1903 – 1 October 1989) was a British composer, arranger and conductor of brass band music, described as "one of the most prolific writers and influential figures in the brass band and choral world".

Biography
He was born in Kingswood, Gloucestershire, the eldest of 16 children whose parents were active in the Salvation Army.  When he was a child, the family moved to Surrey, Kent, and London.  He learned piano and organ, and in 1919 started work in the Salvation Army musical instrument department in central London, soon moving to the Musical Editorial Department as a composer.  He became an officer in the Salvation Army, and in 1928 re-established the Salvationist Publishing and Supplies (S. P. & S.) Band.  The 18-member band, led by Ball, was used extensively at Salvation Army meetings, and recorded.  In 1935, Ball also became the conductor of the Salvation Army's National Orchestra, and also conducted and accompanied the Salvation Singers, and trained band members. In 1942, he became bandmaster of the International Staff Band (I.S.B.), the premier Salvation Army band, with the rank of major.

Ball resigned unexpectedly from the Salvation Army in 1944, after he started attending spiritualist meetings following the death of his sister-in-law.   He soon became involved in judging brass band competitions, and in 1945 became conductor of the Brighouse and Rastrick Brass Band, winning the national championships with them the following year.  He also became editor of The British Bandsman magazine.  In 1948, as conductor of the CWS (Manchester) Band, he won the British Open brass band championship, and he also performed with other bands including the Ransome & Marles band and the City of Coventry Band.

By the mid-1950s, he withdrew from conducting brass bands competitively, to concentrate on teaching and composing music.  He became active in teaching brass band courses in Cornwall, and wrote many test pieces for bands, including "Resurgam" (1950), "Tournament for Brass" (1954), "Main Street" (1961), "Journey Into Freedom" (1967), and "The Wayfarer" (1976).  He also wrote cantatas for chorus and band.

Ball was awarded the OBE in 1969.  He died in Bournemouth in 1989, aged 85.

Selected compositions

The Triumph of Peace
The Kingdom Triumphant
The Eternal Presence
Journey Into Freedom
The King of Kings
The Old Wells
Resurgam
Song of Welcome
Songs in Exile
Star Lake
Torch of Freedom
Tournament for Brass
Morning Rhapsody
Sunset Rhapsody
Festival Music
Indian Summer
Song of Courage
Glory to His Name
The Prospect Before Us
Main Street

National Brass Band Championships of Great Britain
A number of Ball's pieces have been selected as test pieces for the National Brass Band Championships of Great Britain, both at the area contests and the national finals.

Several of his arrangements have also been used.

In addition, several pieces were used as the youth section area contest test piece: The Young in Heart in 1965, Petite Suite de Ballet in 1975, and Rhapsody on Negro Spirituals in 1983.

Further reading
Cooke, Peter M. Eric Ball, the man and his music - biography

References

External links
"The music of Eric Ball (1903-1989) a complete catalogue, with a commentary on his life and work" Masters Thesis by Dennis John Taylor (1994), Durham University.

Brass band composers
1903 births
1989 deaths
English conductors (music)
British male conductors (music)
20th-century British conductors (music)
20th-century English composers
20th-century British male musicians
20th-century British musicians